Luigi Lucheni (April 22, 1873 – October 19, 1910) was an Italian anarchist and the assassin of Empress Elisabeth of Austria.

Early life 

Luigi Lucheni was born Louis Luccheni in Paris on April 22, 1873. His father, unknown, and his mother, Luigia Lucchini, left the baby to a foundling hospital. The child was moved to Italy in August 1874 and transferred between orphanages and foster families. Lucheni worked odd jobs in Italy, Switzerland, and Austria-Hungary. He served in the military for three years and moved to Switzerland, where he befriended anarchists in Lausanne.

Assassination 

On September 10, 1898, Lucheni used a tapered file to fatally stab Empress Elisabeth of Austria during her visit to Geneva. Elisabeth and her lady-in-waiting Countess Sztáray had departed from their hotel on Lake Geneva to ride a paddle steamer to Montreux. They walked without their attendants, as Elisabeth disdained royal processions. On the docks in the early afternoon, Lucheni approached and stabbed Elisabeth below her left breast with a wooden-handled, four-inch file, the kind used to file the eyes of industrial needles. Badly wounded, she nevertheless continued walking, with the support of two other people, 100 yards to board the departing steamer. The steamer returned to shore after Countess Sztáray first noticed Elisabeth's bleeding, whereupon the Empress was carried back to the hotel on a makeshift stretcher. Two doctors pronounced her dead within an hour of the attack. Documentation of the autopsy was destroyed.

Lucheni was apprehended upon fleeing the scene and his file was found the next day. He told the authorities that he was an anarchist who came to Geneva with the intention of killing any sovereign as an example for others. Lucheni used the file because he did not have enough money for a stiletto.

His trial began the next month, in October. He was furious to find that capital punishment had been abolished in Geneva, and wrote a letter demanding that he be tried in another canton, such that he could be martyred. He received the sentence of life imprisonment instead.

Death and legacy 

Lucheni wrote his childhood memoirs while in Geneva's Évêché prison. He was harassed in prison and his notebooks were stolen. He was found hanged in his cell on October 19, 1910. His head was preserved in formaldehyde and transferred to Vienna in 1986. The head was on display in Vienna's Narrenturm until 2000 when the remains were interred at the Wiener Zentralfriedhof.

The assassination began an international conference at which delegates from 21 nations defined anarchism as terrorism and resolved to begin agencies to surveil suspected anarchists and permit capital punishment for assassination of sovereigns. Elisabeth's life and subsequent murder is depicted in many stage productions, films and novels. Lucheni's childhood memoirs were published in 1998.

References

Bibliography

Further reading

External links 

19th-century Italian criminals
1873 births
1910 suicides
Anarchist assassins
Burials at the Vienna Central Cemetery
Empress Elisabeth of Austria
Illegalists
Italian anarchists
Italian people convicted of murder
Italian people imprisoned abroad
Italian people who died in prison custody
Italian prisoners sentenced to life imprisonment
Italian regicides
People convicted of murder by Switzerland
People who committed suicide in prison custody
Prisoners sentenced to life imprisonment by Switzerland
Prisoners who died in Swiss detention
Suicides by hanging in Switzerland
1910 deaths
1898 murders in Switzerland
Murdered anarchists
Death conspiracy theories
French emigrants to Italy